Prawda Wileńska (Wilno's Truth) was a Polish-language Soviet newspaper published in Vilnius in 1940–1948 with a hiatus between 1941–1944.

See also
 Pravda

References

1940 establishments in the Soviet Union
1948 disestablishments in the Soviet Union
Newspapers established in 1940
Polish-language newspapers published in Lithuania
Communist newspapers
Newspapers published in Vilnius
Polish-language newspapers published in the Soviet Union
History of Vilnius